Matt Sarsfield is an English professional rugby league footballer who last played as a second row forward for the Swinton Lions in the Betfred Championship. 

In 2020, he appeared in the eighth series of the E4 reality series Celebs Go Dating.

References

External links
Swinton Lions profile
Salford Red Devils profile

1991 births
Living people
Dewsbury Rams players
English rugby league players
Halifax R.L.F.C. players
Leigh Leopards players
Rugby league locks
Rugby league players from Leigh, Greater Manchester
Salford Red Devils players
Swinton Lions players